Dennis Novikov was the defending champion but lost in the first round to Evan King.

Mikael Torpegaard won the title after defeating Benjamin Becker 6–4, 1–6, 6–2 in the final.

Seeds

Draw

Finals

Top half

Bottom half

References
Main Draw
Qualifying Draw

Columbus Challenger 1 - Singles
Columbus Challenger